This article provides information on candidates who stood for the 1931 Australian federal election. The election was held on 19 December 1931.

In 1931, the Nationalist Party had become the United Australia Party, absorbing several Labor defectors. In New South Wales, the Labor Party split, with the Lang Labor group voting against the Labor Government. Seats held by Labor defectors are here considered to be held by the Labor Party.

By-elections, appointments and defections

By-elections and appointments
On 14 December 1929, Charles Frost (Labor) was elected to replace William McWilliams (Independent) as the member for Franklin.
On 31 January 1931, Charles Marr (Nationalist) was elected to replace Edward McTiernan (Labor) as the member for Parkes.
On 7 March 1931, Eddie Ward (Labor) was elected to replace John West (Labor) as the member for East Sydney.
On 1 April 1931, Harry Kneebone (Labor) was appointed as a South Australian Senator to replace John Chapman (Country).
On 12 May 1931, Tom Brennan (UAP) was appointed as a Victorian Senator to replace Harold Elliott (UAP).
On 14 October 1931, Percy Stewart (Independent), the member for Wimmera, died. No by-election was held due to the proximity of the election.
Subsequent to the election, but prior to the new Senate taking its place:
On 23 December 1931, Patrick Mooney (NSW Labor) was appointed as a New South Wales Senator to replace Walter Duncan (UAP).
On 3 March 1932, Charles Grant (UAP) was appointed as a Tasmanian Senator to replace James Ogden (UAP).

Defections
In 1930, the three MPs elected as Independent Nationalists in 1929 – Billy Hughes (North Sydney), Walter Marks (Wentworth) and George Maxwell (Fawkner) – constituted themselves as the Australian Party.
In 1931, Labor MPs James Fenton (Maribyrnong), Moses Gabb (Angas), Allan Guy (Bass), Joseph Lyons (Wilmot), Charles McGrath (Ballaarat) and John Price (Boothby) resigned from the party in protest at the reappointment of Ted Theodore as Treasurer. They sat with the Opposition Nationalist Party and soon merged with them to become the United Australia Party. The UAP was also joined by the three Australian Party MPs, Billy Hughes (North Sydney), Walter Marks (Wentworth) and George Maxwell (Fawkner).
In 1931, supporters of NSW Premier Jack Lang broke away from the federal Labor Party to form the Australian Labor Party (NSW). Federally, these members were Jack Beasley (West Sydney), Senator James Dunn (New South Wales), John Eldridge (Martin), Rowley James (Hunter), Bert Lazzarini (Werriwa), Senator Arthur Rae (New South Wales) and Eddie Ward (East Sydney).

Seat changes
The member for Eden-Monaro (NSW), John Cusack (Labor), contested Cowper.
The member for Flinders (Vic), Jack Holloway (Labor), contested Melbourne Ports.
The member for Martin (NSW), John Eldridge (NSW Labor), contested Barton.
New South Wales Senator Walter Duncan (UAP) resigned from the Senate to contest Warringah.

Retiring Members and Senators

Labor
 James Mathews MP (Melbourne Ports, Vic)

United Australia
Senator Sir John Newlands (SA)

Country
 William Killen MP (Riverina, NSW)

House of Representatives
Sitting members at the time of the election are shown in bold text. Successful candidates are highlighted in the relevant colour. Where there is possible confusion, an asterisk (*) is also used.

New South Wales

Northern Territory

Queensland

South Australia

Tasmania

Victoria

Western Australia

Senate
Sitting Senators are shown in bold text. Tickets that elected at least one Senator are highlighted in the relevant colour. Successful candidates are identified by an asterisk (*).

New South Wales
Three seats were up for election. The United Australia Party was defending three seats. Labor Senator John Dooley and NSW Labor Senators James Dunn and Arthur Rae were not up for re-election.

Queensland
Three seats were up for election. The United Australia Party-Country Party Coalition was defending three seats. United Australia Party Senators Thomas Crawford, Harry Foll and Matthew Reid were not up for re-election.

South Australia
Three seats were up for election. The Emergency Committee of South Australia was defending three seats. Labor Senators John Daly, Bert Hoare and Mick O'Halloran were not up for re-election.

Tasmania
Three seats were up for election. The United Australia Party was defending three seats. United Australia Party Senators John Hayes, Herbert Hays and James Ogden were not up for re-election.

Victoria
Three seats were up for election. The United Australia Party was defending three seats. Labor Senator John Barnes, United Australia Party Senator Harry Lawson and Country Party Senator Robert Elliott were not up for re-election.

Western Australia
Three seats were up for election. The United Australia Party-Country Party Coalition was defending three seats. United Australia Party Senators Sir Hal Colebatch and Walter Kingsmill and Country Party Senator Bertie Johnston were not up for re-election.

See also
 1931 Australian federal election
 Members of the Australian House of Representatives, 1929–1931
 Members of the Australian House of Representatives, 1931–1934
 Members of the Australian Senate, 1929–1932
 Members of the Australian Senate, 1932–1935
 List of political parties in Australia

Notes

References
Adam Carr's Election Archive - House of Representatives 1931
Adam Carr's Election Archive - Senate 1931

1931 in Australia
Candidates for Australian federal elections